Koresand is a sandbank in the Danish part of the Wadden Sea, south west of the island of Mandø. There was at least one settlement on Koresand until the frequent storm tides during the 1900s led to its being abandoned. In summer it is possible to travel from Mandø to Koresand by a tractor-drawn wagon. 

Danish Wadden Sea Islands
Uninhabited islands of Denmark
Sandbanks of the North Sea
Landforms of Denmark